Joe Louis (1914–1981) was an American world heavyweight boxing champion.

Joe Louis may also refer to:

 Sakorn Yang-keawsot (1922–2007), Thai dancer & puppeteer a.k.a. Joe Louis
 Joe Hill Louis (1921–1957), American musician
 Joe Louis Arena in Detroit
 Jos Louis, chocolate pastry
 Joe Louis (horse), a horse owned by the United States Army

See also
 Joe Lewis (disambiguation)
 Joseph Lewis (disambiguation)

Louis, Joe